Yehuda Patt is a liver cancer specialist, gastrointestinal oncologist, and Professor of Medicine at the University of New Mexico, and resides in Santa Fe, New Mexico. He was previously at the University of Texas, MD Anderson Cancer Center between the years 1975- 2003.  He is the author of various papers pertaining to cancer and their effects on people, and has been cited numerous times for his writings and analyses.

Patt is currently the director of Gastrointestinal Oncology Research at the University of New Mexico, as well as a professor in the Department of Internal Medicine, Division of Hematology/Oncology.

Notable works
Gastrointestinal Cancer - Phase II Trial of Systemic Continuous Fluorouracil and Subcutaneous Recombinant Interferon Alfa-2b for Treatment of Hepatocellular Carcinoma, February 2003
Hepatic arterial infusion of floxuridine, leucovorin, doxorubicin, and cisplatin for hepatocellular carcinoma: effects of hepatitis B and C viral infection on drug toxicity and patient survival, June 1994
Regional hepatic arterial chemotherapy for colorectal cancer metastatic to the liver: the controversy continues., May 1993

References

External links
Patt at the University of New Mexico

Living people
People from Jerusalem
American oncologists
Cancer researchers
University of Texas MD Anderson Cancer Center faculty
Year of birth missing (living people)